The President of Interpol is the governing head of Interpol. The current president is Ahmed Naser Al-Raisi who was elected in November 2021. The president is tasked with presiding and directing the discussions at meetings of the General Assembly and the Executive Committee.

List of officeholders
During World War II, most member states withdrew their support, as a result, Nazi German presidents are not officially recognized.

References